"Before You Kill Us All" is a song written by Max T. Barnes and Keith Follesé, and recorded by American country music singer Randy Travis.  It was released in February 1994 as the lead-off single from his album, This Is Me.  It peaked at number 2 in both the United States and Canada.

Critical reception
Deborah Evans Price, of Billboard magazine reviewed the song favorably, saying that Travis "sounds revitalized on this desperate tale of love lost." She goes on to say that production is "uncharacteristically and refreshingly aggressive."

Music video
The music video was directed by Peter Israelson, and features Travis in an animated crayon drawn world.

Chart performance
"Before You Kill Us All" debuted at number 60 on the U.S. Billboard Hot Country Singles & Tracks for the week of March 12, 1994.

Year-end charts

References

1994 singles
1994 songs
Randy Travis songs
Songs written by Max T. Barnes
Songs written by Keith Follesé
Song recordings produced by Kyle Lehning
Warner Records singles
Animated music videos